Annaberg, United States Virgin Islands may refer to:
Annaberg, Saint Croix, United States Virgin Islands
Annaberg, Saint John, United States Virgin Islands